Princess Louise Charlotte of Denmark (30 October 1789 – 28 March 1864) was a Danish princess, and a princess of Hesse-Kassel by marriage to Prince William of Hesse-Kassel. 

Princess Charlotte was a significant figure in her time. She was one of the leading ladies in the country, and when her brother Christian VIII became king in 1839, she was close to the throne. She played an important role in the succession crisis in Denmark in the first half of the 19th century.

Early life

Princess Charlotte was born on 30 October 1789 at Christiansborg Palace, the principal residence of the Danish Monarchy in central Copenhagen. She was a daughter to Frederick, Hereditary Prince of Denmark and Norway, and Sophia Frederica of Mecklenburg-Schwerin. Her father was a younger son of King Frederick V of Denmark and Norway, while her mother was a daughter of Duke Louis of Mecklenburg-Schwerin. At birth she had two older siblings, Prince Christian Frederick (who later became King of Norway in 1814 and was King of Denmark as Christian VIII from 1839) and Princess Juliane Sophie. She later had a younger brother, Prince Frederick Ferdinand.

When Princess Charlotte was born, her uncle Christian VII was the monarch of Denmark-Norway. Due to the king's mental illness, however, the real ruler was her cousin, Crown Prince Frederick (later King Frederick VI). Charlotte's family had a strained relationship with Crown Prince Frederick and his family due to the power struggles that the king's mental condition had created, but gradually the relationship between the two branches of the royal family was normalized.

Princess Charlotte spent the first years of her life at the large and magnificent baroque palace of Christiansborg. As a summer residence, the family owned Sorgenfri Palace, located on the shores of the small river Mølleåen in Kongens Lyngby north of Copenhagen. 

The year 1794 was an eventful year for the young princess and her family. In February 1794, a fire destroyed Christiansborg Palace, and the family was forced to move to Levetzau's Palace, a rococo palace which forms part of the Amalienborg Palace complex in the district of Frederiksstaden in central Copenhagen. And in november 1794, when Princess Charlotte was five years old, her mother, who was in poor health, died at the age of just 36. 

Princess Charlotte was confirmed on 22 May 1803 in the chapel of Frederiksberg Palace along with her brother Prince Christian Frederik and sister Princess Juliane Sophie.

Marriage

On 10 November 1810 in Amalienborg Palace, she married Prince William of Hesse-Kassel. Her spouse was in Danish service from his youth, and the family lived in Denmark. The couple initially settled on Sankt Annæ Plads in central Copenhagen in what was called the Prince William Mansion. Later, the couple moved into the Brockdorff's Palace at Amalienborg. As their country residence they received Charlottenlund Palace, located on the shores of the Øresund Strait 10 kilometers north of Copenhagen.

Later life 

Princess Charlotte was described as wise, practical and thrifty, keeping the finances of her household under strict control. She had some interest in art and poetry, and reportedly felt herself to be a Danish patriot.  Charlotte played some part in the succession crisis which occurred because her half first cousin, King Frederick VI of Denmark, lacked a male heir. She supported the solution that her branch of the family should succeed to the throne, and because of this, she opposed the Schleswig-Holstein matter. 

In 1839, her brother Christian VIII of Denmark succeeded their cousin on the throne, and during his reign, Charlotte had an important position at the Danish royal court in Copenhagen because her brother favored that her line of the family should succeed to the throne after his male line had died out.

In 1848, her brother died and was succeeded by his childless son, her nephew, king Frederick VII of Denmark. In 1850, the Danish government was pressured by the Empire of Russia to discontinue its support of her line in the succession order in favor of the Duke of Oldenburg, her son-in-law. Christian of Oldenburg had displayed anti-Danish sentiment during the recent war, and when gehejmeråd F.C. Dankwart, on behalf of the government, issued the demand that she should renounce her, her son's, and eldest daughter's right to the throne in favor of her second daughter and her husband, she replied: "It is impossible: the Danish people would under no circumstance accept as King a Prince from a house that has made war against Denmark, and that is so hostile toward us". In exchange, she demanded that the House of Oldenburg purchase the Duchy of Hesse and declare it a kingdom, so that her son Frederick could "Switch one Kingdom for another". On 18 July 1851, after having been persuaded that her terms were impossible and that Christian of Oldenburg in fact had good support for his claim, Charlotte agreed to renounce her, her son Frederick's, and her eldest daughter Marie Louise Charlotte's claims to the throne in favour of her second daughter Louise, who in turn renounced her own claim in favor of her spouse, Christian.

Louise Charlotte is the matrilineal great-grandmother of Nicholas II of Russia, William IV, Grand Duke of Luxembourg and 
George V.

She died in Christiansborg Palace.

Issue
Princess Caroline Frederica of Hesse-Kassel (15 August 1811 – 10 May 1829)
Princess Marie Luise Charlotte of Hesse-Kassel (9 May 1814 – 28 July 1895) married Prince Frederick Augustus of Anhalt-Dessau.
Princess Louise of Hesse-Kassel (7 September 1817 – 29 September 1898) married Christian IX of Denmark.
Frederick William, Landgrave of Hesse-Kassel (26 November 1820 – 14 October 1884) married first Grand Duchess Alexandra Nikolaevna of Russia and she died soon after their marriage, and second Princess Anna of Prussia.
Princess Auguste Sophie of Hesse-Kassel (30 October 1823 – 17 July 1889) married Baron Carl Frederik Blixen-Finecke.
Princess Sophie Wilhelmine of Hesse-Kassel (18 January – 20 December 1827)

Ancestry

References

Citations

Bibliography

External links 

1789 births
1864 deaths
19th-century Danish people
19th-century Norwegian people
Danish princesses
House of Hesse-Kassel
House of Oldenburg in Denmark
Landgravines of Hesse-Kassel
Norwegian princesses
Burials at Roskilde Cathedral